Denmark was represented by Tommy Seebach, with the song "Disco Tango", at the 1979 Eurovision Song Contest, which took place on 31 March in Jerusalem. "Disco Tango" was chosen as the Danish entry at the Dansk Melodi Grand Prix on 3 February, and was the first of Seebach's three Eurovision appearances for Denmark. The 1979 DMGP is notable for the participation of two of Denmark's three Eurovision winners, Grethe Ingmann and the Olsen Brothers.

Before Eurovision

Dansk Melodi Grand Prix 1979 
The Dansk Melodi Grand Prix 1979 was held at the DR TV studios in Copenhagen, hosted by Jørgen Mylius. 17 songs took part with the winner being decided by votes from eight regional juries. The main voting resulted in a tie for first place between "Disco Tango" performed by Tommy Seebach and "Alt er skønt" performed by Grethe Ingmann & Bjarne Liller. The tie was resolved after a revote, which was won by "Disco Tango" performed by Tommy Seebach.

Rasmus Lyberth performed in Greenlandic, and Annika Hoydal in Faroese.

At Eurovision 
On the night of the final Seebach performed 3rd in the running order, following Italy and preceding Ireland. Among the backing singers was Debbie Cameron, with whom Seebach would perform as a duo in the 1981 Eurovision. At the close of voting "Disco Tango" had received 76 points, placing Denmark 6th of the 19 entries. The Danish jury awarded its 12 points to Germany.

Voting

References 

1979
Countries in the Eurovision Song Contest 1979
Eurovision